The PWA Iron Horse Television Championship was a professional wrestling secondary championship in Pro Wrestling America (PWA). It remained active until 1990 when the title was abandoned.

The inaugural champion was Danny Gage, who defeated Mohammed Abass in Anoka, Minnesota on January 15, 1985 to become the first PWA Iron Horse Television Champion. Derrick Dukes holds the record for most reigns, with three. At 532 days, Danny Gage's first and only reign is the longest in the title's history. Derrick Dukes's third reign was the shortest in the history of the title lasting 13 days. Overall, there have been 10 reigns shared between eight wrestlers, with two vacancies, and one deactivation.

Title history
Key

Reigns

List of combined reigns

Footnotes

References
General

Specific

External links
PWA Iron Horse Television Title at Cagewrestling.de

Television wrestling championships